Zeba Blay is a Ghanaian-American writer and culture critic and former senior culture writer for The Huffington Post. She coined the hashtag #Carefree BlackGirl in 2013 and published her accompanying debut Carefree Black Girls: A Celebration of Black Women in Pop Culture in 2021.

Early life and education 
Blay was born in Ghana and raised in Jersey City, New Jersey. She took a film class in high school that cultivated her interest in criticism. In 2013, she received her bachelor's degree from The New School's Eugene Lang College, where she created an original concentration in cultural criticism. 

She named Toni Morrison, Janet Mock, Manohla Dargis, and Greg Tate as writers who are particularly influential to her work.

Career

Writing 
Blay's writing has been in published in The New York Times, The Village Voice, IndieWire, Film Comment, and others. She was a culture writer at HuffPost from 2013 until 2021. Her work has been cited in outlets including NPR, Vogue, and Vox. She was a writer for the web series MTV Decoded, hosted by Franchesca Ramsey.

She coined the viral hashtag #CarefreeBlackGirl on Twitter in October 2013, as a method "to assert and affirm my right to exist." In October 2021, she released her debut book based on the concept, Carefree Black Girls: A Celebration of Black Women in Pop Culture, an essay collection on the contributions of Black women to American culture. The book explores topics including colorism, the policing of Black women's bodies, Cardi B, and her insights as a working journalist. She also includes her personal experiences with anxiety and depression.

Blay announced that she will release two books in 2022.

Other work 
Blay co-hosted the pop culture podcast Two Brown Girls with Fariha Róisín from 2012–2017.

She uses her personal Instagram as an archive for images related to Black expression, emotion, and care.

Personal life 
Blay resides in New York City.

Works

References

External links 
 Official website

Year of birth missing (living people)
Living people
21st-century American women writers
American people of Ghanaian descent
21st-century Ghanaian writers
Writers from Jersey City, New Jersey
The New School alumni
American women critics
American women essayists